When Harry Became Sally: Responding to the Transgender Moment is a book critical of modern transgender rights and certain treatments for gender dysphoria, written by the socially conservative political philosopher Ryan T. Anderson and published by Encounter Books in 2018.  The book focuses on the cultural and political debates surrounding transgender identity, with a particular focus on criticizing what the author describes as "transgender ideology".

When Harry Became Sally was criticized for repeatedly using the birth or other former name (deadnaming) of trans people, and ignoring the realities that trans people face. On the other hand, it has received praise, notably from conservative media.

In February 2021 the book was the first removed from Amazon.com's store under a new hate speech policy enacted by the company. The move was criticized by the National Coalition Against Censorship, and United States Senator Tom Cotton. On March 12, in response to a letter from four other senators, Amazon clarified that the company has "chosen not to sell books that frame LGBTQ+ identity as a mental illness." Anderson denies that his book describes transgender persons as "mentally ill".

See also
Walt Heyer
What Is a Woman?, a documentary presented by conservative commentator Matt Walsh that explores transgender issues by asking the titular question to various people.

References

External links
When Harry Became Sally, Encounter Books

2018 non-fiction books
LGBT-related controversies in literature
Transgender non-fiction books